The Eastern Catholic Churches or Oriental Catholic Churches, also called the Eastern-Rite Catholic Churches, Eastern Rite Catholicism, or simply the Eastern Churches, are 23 Eastern Christian autonomous (sui iuris) particular churches of the Catholic Church, in full communion with the Pope in Rome. Although they are distinct theologically, liturgically, and historically from the Latin Church, they are all in full communion with it and with each other. Eastern Catholics are a distinct minority within the Catholic Church; of the 1.3 billion Catholics in communion with the Pope, approximately 18 million are members of the eastern churches. 

The majority of the Eastern Catholic Churches are groups that, at different points in the past, used to belong to the Eastern Orthodox Church, the Oriental Orthodox churches, or the historic Church of the East; these churches underwent various schisms throughout history. The Eastern Catholics churches are communities of Eastern Christians that either returned to communion with the Pope, or in some cases have never broken communion. The Pope's recognition of Eastern Catholics who returned to communion has been a point of controversy in ecumenical relations with the Eastern Orthodox and other churches. The five historic liturgical traditions of eastern Christianity, comprising the Alexandrian Rite, the Armenian Rite, the Byzantine Rite, the East Syriac Rite, and the West Syriac Rite, are all represented within Eastern Catholic liturgy. Consequently, the Catholic Church consists of six liturgical rites, the eastern rites along with the liturgical rites of the Latin Church. On occasion, this leads to a conflation of the liturgical word "rite" and the institutional word "church". Although some theological issues divide the Eastern Catholic Churches from other eastern churches not in communion with the pope, some Eastern Catholic jurisdictions admit members of the latter to the Eucharist and the other sacraments, as governed by applicable Eastern Catholic canon law.  

Full communion with the Bishop of Rome constitutes mutual sacramental sharing between the Eastern Catholic Churches and the Latin Church, including Eucharistic intercommunion and recognition of papal supremacy. Provisions within the 1983 Latin canon law and the 1990 Code of Canons of the Eastern Churches govern the relationship between the Eastern and Latin Churches. Historically, pressure to conform to the norms of the Western Christianity practiced by the majority Latin Church led to a degree of encroachment (Latinization) on some of the Eastern Catholic traditions. The Second Vatican Council document, Orientalium Ecclesiarum, built on previous reforms to reaffirm the right of Eastern Catholics to maintain their distinct liturgical practices, which reflect ancient theological and spiritual practices that developed within Eastern Christianity. 

The Code of Canons of the Eastern Churches, promulgated in 1990, was the first codified body of canon law governing the Eastern Catholic Churches collectively, superseding a series of ad hoc papal documents issued in the late 20th century on the matter, although each church also has its own internal canons and laws on top of this. Members of Eastern Catholic churches are obliged to follow the norms of their particular church regarding celebration of church feasts, marriage, and other customs.  Notable distinct norms include many Eastern Catholic Churches regularly allowing the ordination of married men to the priesthood (although not as bishops to the episcopacy), in contrast to the stricter clerical celibacy of Latin Church. Additionally, Eastern Catholics who seek marriage are obliged by canon law have the union blessed by a priest, even when the marriage itself takes place at a Latin Church parish. The Latin Church, in contrast, allows both deacons and priests to witness a couple's marriage vows on behalf of the Catholic Church. Both Latin and Eastern Catholics may, however, freely attend a Catholic liturgy celebrated in any rite.

Terminology

Although Eastern Catholics are in full communion with the Pope and members of the worldwide Catholic Church, they are not members of the Latin Church, which uses the Latin liturgical rites, among which the Roman Rite is the most widespread. The Eastern Catholic churches are instead distinct particular churches sui iuris, although they maintain full and equal, mutual sacramental exchange with members of the Latin Church.

Rite or church
There are different meanings of the word rite. Apart from its reference to the liturgical patrimony of a particular church, the word has been and is still sometimes, even if rarely, officially used of the particular church itself. Thus the term Latin rite can refer either to the Latin Church or to one or more of the Western liturgical rites, which include the majority Roman Rite but also the Ambrosian Rite, the Mozarabic Rite, and others.

In the 1990 Code of Canons of the Eastern Churches (CCEO), the terms autonomous Church and rite are thus defined:

When speaking of Eastern Catholic Churches, the Latin Church's 1983 Code of Canon Law (1983CIC) uses the terms "ritual Church" or "ritual Church " (canons 111 and 112), and also speaks of "a subject of an Eastern rite" (canon 1015 §2), "Ordinaries of another rite" (canon 450 §1), "the faithful of a specific rite" (canon 476), etc. The Second Vatican Council spoke of Eastern Catholic Churches as "particular Churches or rites".

In 1999, the United States Conference of Catholic Bishops stated: "We have been accustomed to speaking of the Latin (Roman or Western) Rite or the Eastern Rites to designate these different Churches. However, the Church's contemporary legislation as contained in the Code of Canon Law and the Code of Canons of the Eastern Churches makes it clear that we ought to speak, not of rites, but of Churches. Canon 112 of the Code of Canon Law uses the phrase 'autonomous ritual Churches' to designate the various Churches." And a writer in a periodical of January 2006 declared: "The Eastern Churches are still mistakenly called 'Eastern-Rite' Churches, a reference to their various liturgical histories. They are most properly called Eastern Churches, or Eastern Catholic Churches." However, the term "rite" continues to be used. The  forbids a Latin bishop to ordain, without permission of the Holy See, a subject of his who is "of an Eastern rite" (not "who uses an Eastern rite", the faculty for which is sometimes granted to Latin clergy).

Uniate

The term Uniat or Uniate has been applied to Eastern Catholic churches and individual members whose church hierarchies were previously part of Eastern Orthodox or Oriental Orthodox churches. The term is sometimes considered derogatory by such people, though it was used by some Latin and Eastern Catholics prior to the Second Vatican Council of 1962-1965. Official Catholic documents no longer use the term due to its perceived negative overtones.

History

Background

Eastern Catholic Churches have their origins in the Middle East, North Africa, East Africa, Eastern Europe and South India. However, since the 19th century, diaspora has spread to Western Europe, the Americas and Oceania in part because of persecution, where eparchies have been established to serve adherents alongside those of Latin Church dioceses. Latin Catholics in the Middle East, on the other hand, are traditionally cared for by the Latin Patriarchate of Jerusalem.

Communion between Christian churches has been broken over matters of faith, whereby each side accused the other of heresy or departure from the true faith (orthodoxy). Communion has been broken also because of disagreement about questions of authority or the legitimacy of the election of a particular bishop. In these latter cases each side accused the other of schism, but not of heresy.

The following ecumenical councils are major breaches of communion:

Council of Ephesus (AD 431) 
In 431, the churches that accepted the teaching of the Council of Ephesus (which condemned the views of Nestorius) classified as heretics those who rejected the council's statements. The Church of the East, which was mainly under the Sassanid Empire, never accepted the council's views. It later experienced a period of great expansion in Asia before collapsing after the Mongol invasion of the Middle East in the 14th century.

Monuments of their presence still exist in China. Now they are relatively few in number and have divided into three churches: the Chaldean Catholic Church—an Eastern Catholic church in full communion with Rome—and two Assyrian churches which are not in communion with either Rome or each other. The Chaldean Catholic Church is the largest of the three. The groups of Assyrians who did not reunify with Rome remained and are known as the Assyrian Church of the East, which experienced an internal schism in 1968 which led to the creation of the Ancient Church of the East.

The Syro-Malabar and Syro-Malankara churches are the two Eastern Catholic descendants of the Church of the East in the Indian subcontinent.

Council of Chalcedon (AD 451) 
In 451, those who accepted the Council of Chalcedon similarly classified those who rejected it as Monophysite heretics. The Churches that refused to accept the Council considered instead that it was they who were orthodox; they reject the description Monophysite (meaning only-nature) preferring instead Miaphysite (meaning one-nature). The difference in terms may appear subtle, but it is theologically very important. "Monophysite" implies a single divine nature alone with no real human nature—a heretical belief according to Chalcedonian Christianity—whereas "Miaphysite" can be understood to mean one nature as God, existing in the person of Jesus who is both human and divine—an idea more easily reconciled to Chalcedonian doctrine. They are often called, in English, Oriental Orthodox Churches, to distinguish them from the Eastern Orthodox Churches.

This distinction, by which the words oriental and eastern that in themselves have exactly the same meaning but are used as labels to describe two different realities, is impossible to translate in most other languages, and is not universally accepted even in English. These churches are also referred to as pre-Chalcedonian or now more rarely as non-Chalcedonian or anti-Chalcedonian. In languages other than English other means are used to distinguish the two families of Churches. Some reserve the term "Orthodox" for those that are here called "Eastern Orthodox" Churches, but members of what are called "Oriental Orthodox" Churches consider this illicit.

East–West Schism (1054) 
The East–West Schism came about in the context of cultural differences between the Greek-speaking East and Latin-speaking West, and of rivalry between the Churches in Rome—which claimed a primacy not merely of honour but also of authority—and in Constantinople, which claimed parity with Rome. The rivalry and lack of comprehension gave rise to controversies, some of which appear already in the acts of the Quinisext Council of 692. At the Council of Florence (1431–1445), these controversies about Western theological elaborations and usages were identified as, chiefly, the insertion of "Filioque" into the Nicene Creed, the use of unleavened bread for the Eucharist, purgatory, and the authority of the pope.

The schism is generally considered to have started in 1054, when the Patriarch of Constantinople, Michael I Cerularius, and the Papal Legate, Humbert of Silva Candida, issued mutual excommunications; in 1965, these excommunications were revoked by both Rome and Constantinople. In spite of that event, for many years both churches continued to maintain friendly relations and seemed to be unaware of any formal or final rupture.

However, estrangement continued. In 1190, Eastern Orthodox theologian Theodore Balsamon, who was patriarch of Antioch, wrote that "no Latin should be given Communion unless he first declares that he will abstain from the doctrines and customs that separate him from us".

Later in 1204, Constantinople was sacked by the Catholic armies of the Fourth Crusade, whereas two decades previously the Massacre of the Latins (i.e., Catholics) had occurred in Constantinople in 1182. Thus, by the 12th–13th centuries, the two sides had become openly hostile, each considering that the other no longer belonged to the church that was orthodox and catholic. Over time, it became customary to refer to the Eastern side as the Orthodox Church and the Western as the Catholic Church, without either side thereby renouncing its claim of being the truly orthodox or the truly catholic church.

Attempts at restoring communion

Parties within many non-Latin churches repeatedly sought to organize efforts to restore communion. In 1438, the Council of Florence convened, which featured a strong dialogue focused on understanding the theological differences between the East and West, with the hope of reuniting the Catholic and Orthodox churches. Several eastern churches associated themselves with Rome, forming Eastern Catholic churches. The See of Rome accepted them without requiring that they adopt the customs of the Latin Church, so that they all have their own "liturgical, theological, spiritual and disciplinary heritage, differentiated by peoples' culture and historical circumstances, that finds expression in each  Church's own way of living the faith".

Emergence of the churches

Most Eastern Catholic churches arose when a group within an ancient church in disagreement with the See of Rome returned to full communion with that see. The following churches have been in communion with the Bishop of Rome for a large part of their history:
 The Maronite Church, which has no counterpart in Byzantine, nor Oriental, Orthodoxy. The Maronite Church has historical connections to the Monothelite controversy in the 7th century. It re-affirmed unity with the Holy See in 1154 during the Crusades.
The Maronite Church has historically been treated as never having fully schismed with the Holy See, despite a dispute over Christological doctrine that concluded in 1154; most of the other Eastern Catholic churches came into being from the 16th century onwards. However, the Melkite Greek Catholic Church, the Syro-Malabar Church and the Italo-Albanian Catholic Church also claim perpetual communion.
 The Albanian Greek Catholic Church and Italo-Albanian Catholic Church, which, unlike the Maronite Church, use the same liturgical rite as the Eastern Orthodox Church.
 The former Melkite Church considered itself in dual communion with Rome and Constantinople until an exclusively Orthodox body was formed in the 18th century, leaving a remainder unified exclusively with Rome as the Melkite Greek Catholic Church.
 The Oriental Orthodox Armenian Apostolic Church had included a long-standing minority that accepted Roman primacy until the Armenian Catholic Church was officially established in the 18th century.

The canon law shared by all Eastern Catholic churches, was codified in 1990. The dicastery that works with the Eastern Catholic churches is the Dicastery for the Eastern Churches, which by law includes as members all Eastern Catholic patriarchs and major archbishops. 

The largest six churches based on membership are the Ukrainian Greek Catholic Church (UGCC; Byzantine Rite), the Syro-Malabar Catholic Church (East Syriac Rite), the Maronite Church (West Syriac Rite), the Melkite Greek Catholic Church (Byzantine Rite), the Chaldean Catholic Church (East Syriac Rite), and the Armenian Catholic Church (Armenian Rite). These six churches account for about 85% of the membership of the Eastern Catholic Churches.

Orientalium dignitas

On 30 November 1894, Pope Leo XIII issued the apostolic constitution Orientalium dignitas, in which he stated:

Adrian Fortescue wrote that Leo XIII "begins by explaining again that the ancient Eastern rites are a witness to the Apostolicity of the Catholic Church, that their diversity, consistent with unity of the faith, is itself a witness to the unity of the Church, that they add to her dignity and honour. He says that the Catholic Church does not possess one rite only, but that she embraces all the ancient rites of Christendom; her unity consists not in a mechanical uniformity of all her parts, but on the contrary, in their variety, according in one principle and vivified by it."

Leo XIII declared still in force Pope Benedict XIV's encyclical Demandatam, addressed to the Patriarch and the Bishops of the Melkite Catholic Church, in which Benedict XIV forbade Latin Church clergy to induce Melkite Catholics to transfer to the Roman Rite, and he broadened this prohibition to cover all Eastern Catholics, declaring: "Any Latin rite missionary, whether of the secular or religious clergy, who induces with his advice or assistance any Eastern rite faithful to transfer to the Latin rite, will be deposed and excluded from his benefice in addition to the ipso facto suspension a divinis and other punishments that he will incur as imposed in the aforesaid Constitution Demandatam."

Second Vatican Council

There had been confusion on the part of Western clergy about the legitimate presence of Eastern Catholic Churches in countries seen as belonging to the West, despite firm and repeated papal confirmation of these Churches' universal character. The Second Vatican Council brought the reform impulse to visible fruition. Several documents, from both during and after the Second Vatican Council, have led to significant reform and development within Eastern Catholic Churches.

Orientalium Ecclesiarum

The Second Vatican Council directed, in Orientalium Ecclesiarum, that the traditions of Eastern Catholic Churches should be maintained. It declared that "it is the mind of the Catholic Church that each individual Church or Rite should retain its traditions whole and entire and likewise that it should adapt its way of life to the different needs of time and place" (n. 2), and that they should all "preserve their legitimate liturgical rite and their established way of life, and ... these may not be altered except to obtain for themselves an organic improvement" (n. 6; cf. n. 22).

It confirmed and approved the ancient discipline of the sacraments existing in the Eastern churches, and the ritual practices connected with their celebration and administration, and declared its ardent desire that this should be re-established, if circumstances warranted (n. 12). It applied this in particular to administration of sacrament of Confirmation by priests (n. 13). It expressed the wish that, where the permanent diaconate (ordination as deacons of men who are not intended afterwards to become priests) had fallen into disuse, it should be restored (n. 17).

Paragraphs 7–11 are devoted to the powers of the patriarchs and major archbishops of the Eastern Churches, whose rights and privileges, it says, should be re-established in accordance with the ancient tradition of each of the Churches and the decrees of the ecumenical councils, adapted somewhat to modern conditions. Where there is need, new patriarchates should be established either by an ecumenical council or by the Bishop of Rome.

Lumen gentium
The Second Vatican Council's Dogmatic Constitution on the Church, Lumen gentium, deals with Eastern Catholic Churches in paragraph 23, stating:

Unitatis redintegratio
The 1964 decree Unitatis redintegratio deals with Eastern Catholic Churches in paragraphs 14–17.

Code of Canons of the Eastern Churches

The First Vatican Council discussed the need for a common code for the Eastern churches, but no concrete action was taken. Only after the benefits of the Latin Church's 1917 Code of Canon Law were appreciated was a serious effort made to codify the Eastern Catholic Churches' canon laws. This came to fruition with the promulgation of the 1990 Code of Canons of the Eastern Churches, which took effect in 1991. It is a framework document that contains canons that are a consequence of the common patrimony of the churches of the East: each individual  church also has its own canons, its own particular law, layered on top of this code.

Joint International Commission

In 1993 the Joint International Commission for Theological Dialogue Between the Catholic Church and the Orthodox Church submitted the document Uniatism, method of union of the past, and the present search for full communion, also known as the Balamand declaration, "to the authorities of the Catholic and Orthodox Churches for approval and application,"
which stated that initiatives that "led to the union of certain communities with the See of Rome and brought with them, as a consequence, the breaking of communion with their Mother Churches of the East ... took place not without the interference of extra-ecclesial interests".

Likewise the commission acknowledged that "certain civil authorities [who] made attempts" to force Eastern Catholics to return to the Orthodox Church used "unacceptable means". The missionary outlook and proselytism that accompanied the Unia was judged incompatible with the rediscovery by the Catholic and Orthodox Churches of each other as Sister Churches. Thus the commission concluded that the "missionary apostolate, ... which has been called 'uniatism', can no longer be accepted either as a method to be followed or as a model of the unity our Churches are seeking."

At the same time, the commission stated:
 that Eastern Catholic Churches, being part of the Catholic Communion, have the right to exist and to act in response to the spiritual needs of their faithful;
 that Oriental Catholic Churches, which desired to re-establish full communion with the See of Rome and have remained faithful to it, have the rights and obligations connected with this communion.
These principles were repeated in the 2016 Joint Declaration of Pope Francis and Patriarch Kirill, which stated that 'It is today clear that the past method of “uniatism”, understood as the union of one community to the other, separating it from its Church, is not the way to re–establish unity. Nonetheless, the ecclesial communities which emerged in these historical circumstances have the right to exist and to undertake all that is necessary to meet the spiritual needs of their faithful, while seeking to live in peace with their neighbours. Orthodox and Greek Catholics are in need of reconciliation and of mutually acceptable forms of co–existence.'

Liturgical prescriptions

The 1996 Instruction for Applying the Liturgical Prescriptions of the Code of Canons of the Eastern Churches brought together, in one place, the developments that took place in previous texts, and is "an expository expansion based upon the canons, with constant emphasis upon the preservation of Eastern liturgical traditions and a return to those usages whenever possible—certainly in preference to the usages of the Latin Church, however much some principles and norms of the conciliar constitution on the Roman rite, "in the very nature of things, affect other rites as well." The Instruction states:

Past interventions by the Holy See, the Instruction said, were in some ways defective and needed revision, but often served also as a safeguard against aggressive initiatives.

Organisation

Papal supreme authority

Under the Code of Canons of the Eastern Churches, the Pope has supreme, full, immediate and universal ordinary authority in the whole Catholic Church, which he can always freely exercise, including the Eastern Catholic churches.

Eastern patriarchs and major archbishops

 
The Catholic patriarchs and major archbishops derive their titles from the sees of Alexandria (Coptic), Antioch (Syriac, Melkite, Maronite), Babylon (Chaldean), Cilicia (Armenian), Kyiv-Halych (Ukrainian), Ernakulam-Angamaly (Syro-Malabar), Trivandrum (Syro-Malankara), and Făgăraş-Alba Iulia (Romanian). The Eastern Catholic churches are governed in accordance with Code of Canons of the Eastern Churches.

Within their proper  churches there is no difference between patriarchs and major archbishops. However, differences exist in the order of precedence (i.e. patriarchs take precedence over major archbishops) and in the mode of accession: The election of a major archbishop has to be confirmed by the pope before he may take office. No papal confirmation is needed for newly elected patriarchs before they take office. They are just required to request as soon as possible that the pope grant them full ecclesiastical communion.

Variants of organizational structure
There are significant differences between various Eastern Catholic churches, regarding their present organizational structure. Major Eastern Catholic churches, that are headed by their patriarchs, major archbishops or metropolitans, have fully developed structure and functioning internal autonomy based on the existence of ecclesiastical provinces. On the other hand, minor Eastern Catholic churches often have only one or two hierarchs (in the form of eparchs, apostolic exarchs, or apostolic visitors) and only the most basic forms of internal organization if any, like the Belarusian Greek Catholic Church or the Russian Greek Catholic Church. Individual eparchies of some Eastern Catholic churches may be suffragan to Latin metropolitans. For example, the Greek Catholic Eparchy of Križevci is suffragan to the Roman Catholic Archdiocese of Zagreb. Also, some minor Eastern Catholic churches have Latin prelates. For example, the Macedonian Greek Catholic Church is organized as a single Eparchy of Strumica-Skopje, whose present ordinary is the Roman Catholic bishop of Skopje. The organization of the Albanian Greek Catholic Church is unique in that it consists of an "Apostolic Administration".

Juridical status

Although every diocese in the Catholic Church is considered a particular church, the word is not applied in the same sense as to the 24  particular churches: the Latin Church and the 23 Eastern Catholic Churches.

Thus a Maronite Catholic is normally directly subject only to a Maronite bishop. However, if members of a particular church are so few that no hierarchy of their own has been established, their spiritual care is entrusted to a bishop of another ritual church. For instance, members of the Latin Church in Eritrea are under the care of the Eastern rite Eritrean Catholic Church, whereas the other way around may be the case in other parts of the world.

Theologically, all the particular churches can be viewed as "sister churches". According to the Second Vatican Council these Eastern Catholic churches, along with the larger Latin Church, share "equal dignity, so that none of them is superior to the others as regards rite, and they enjoy the same rights and are under the same obligations, also in respect of preaching the Gospel to the whole world (cf. ) under the guidance of the Roman Pontiff."

The Eastern Catholic churches are in full communion with the whole Catholic Church. While they accept the canonical authority of the Holy See of Rome, they retain their distinctive liturgical rites, laws, customs and traditional devotions, and have their own theological emphases. Terminology may vary: for instance, diocese and eparchy, vicar general and protosyncellus, confirmation and chrismation are respectively Western and Eastern terms for the same realities. The mysteries (sacraments) of baptism and chrismation are generally administered, according to the ancient tradition of the church, one immediately after the other. Infants who are baptized and chrismated are also given the Eucharist.

The Eastern Catholic churches are represented in the Holy See and the Roman Curia through the Dicastery for the Eastern Churches, which is "made up of a Cardinal Prefect (who directs and represents it with the help of a Secretary) and 27 cardinals, one archbishop and 4 bishops, designated by the pope  (for a five-year period). Members by right are the Patriarchs and the Major Archbishops of the Oriental Churches and the President of the Pontifical Council for the Promotion of Unity among Christians."

Totalling about 16 million members, the greatest numbers of Eastern Catholics may be found in Eastern Europe (Ukraine, Romania, Slovakia), Eastern Africa and the Middle East (Egypt, Iraq, Lebanon, Syria) and India.

Bi-ritual faculties

While "clerics and members of institutes of consecrated life are bound to observe their own rite faithfully", priests are occasionally given permission to celebrate the liturgy of a rite other than the priest's own rite, by what is known as a grant of "biritual faculties". The reason for this permission is usually the service of Catholics who have no priest of their own rite. Thus priests of the Syro-Malabar Church working as missionaries in areas of India in which there are no structures of their own Church, are authorized to use the Roman Rite in those areas, and Latin priests are, after due preparation, given permission to use an Eastern rite for the service of members of an Eastern Catholic Church living in a country in which there are no priests of their own particular Church. Popes are permitted to celebrate a Mass or Divine Liturgy of any rite in testament to the Catholic Church's universal nature. John Paul II celebrated the Divine Liturgy in Ukraine during his pontificate.

For a just cause, and with the permission of the local bishop, priests of different autonomous ritual Churches may concelebrate; however, the rite of the principal celebrant is used whilst each priest wears the vestments of his own rite. No indult of bi-ritualism is required for this.

Biritual faculties may concern not only clergy but also religious, enabling them to become members of an institute of an autonomous Church other than their own.

Clerical celibacy

Eastern and Western Christian churches have different traditions concerning clerical celibacy and the resulting controversies have played a role in the relationship between the two groups in some Western countries.

In general, Eastern Catholic Churches have always allowed ordination of married men as priests and deacons. Within the lands of the Ukrainian Greek Catholic Church, the largest Eastern Catholic Church, where 90% of the diocesan priests in Ukraine are married, priests' children often became priests and married within their social group, establishing a tightly knit hereditary caste.

Most Eastern Churches distinguish between "monastic" and "non-monastic" clergy. Monastics do not necessarily live in monasteries, but have spent at least part of their period of training in such a context. Their monastic vows include a vow of celibate chastity.

Bishops are normally selected from the monastic clergy, and in most Eastern Catholic Churches a large percentage of priests and deacons also are celibate, while a large portion of the parish priests are married, having taken a wife when they were still laymen. If someone preparing for the diaconate or priesthood wishes to marry, this must happen before ordination.

In territories where Eastern traditions prevail, married clergy caused little controversy, but aroused opposition inside traditionally Latin Church territories to which Eastern Catholics migrated; this was particularly so in the United States. In response to requests from the Latin bishops of those countries, the Congregation for the Propagation of the Faith set out rules in an 1890 letter to François-Marie-Benjamin Richard, archbishop of Paris, which the Congregation applied on 1 May 1897 to the United States, stating that only celibates or widowed priests coming without their children should be permitted in the United States.

This celibacy mandate for Eastern Catholic priests in the United States was restated with special reference to Ruthenians by the 1 March 1929 decree Cum data fuerit, which was renewed for a further ten years in 1939. Dissatisfaction by many Ruthenian Catholics in the United States gave rise to the American Carpatho-Russian Orthodox Diocese. The mandate, which applied in some other countries also, was removed by a decree of June 2014.

While most Eastern Catholic Churches admit married men to ordination as priests (although not allowing priests to marry after ordination), some have adopted mandatory clerical celibacy, as in the Latin Church. These include the India-based Syro-Malankara Catholic Church and Syro-Malabar Catholic Church, and the Coptic Catholic Church.

In 2014, Pope Francis approved new norms for married clergy within Eastern Catholic Churches through  canon 758 § 3. The new norms abrogated previous norms and now allow those Eastern Catholic Churches with married clergy to ordain married men inside traditionally Latin territories and to grant faculties inside traditionally Latin territories to married Eastern Catholic clergy previously ordained elsewhere. This latter change will allow married Eastern Catholic priests to follow their faithful to whatever country they may immigrate to, addressing an issue which has arisen with the exodus of so many Christians from Eastern Europe and the Middle East in recent decades.

List of Eastern Catholic churches

The Holy See's Annuario Pontificio gives the following list of Eastern Catholic churches with the principal episcopal see of each and the countries (or larger political areas) where they have ecclesiastical jurisdiction, to which are here added the date of union or foundation in parenthesis and the membership in brackets. The total membership for all Eastern Catholic churches is at least 16,336,000 people. Eternal Word Television Network (EWTN) gives the same list, except that it does not place the liturgical traditions in the alphabetical order in which they are given by both the Annuario Pontificio and  canon 28, and, as noted below, it treats the Apostolic Exarchate for Byzantine-Rite Catholics in the Czech Republic, which for the Holy See is canonically part of the Ruthenian Catholic Church, as if it were a separate autonomous church.

{|class="wikitable sortable"
|+ Eastern Catholic Churches
Jurisdiction and bishop numbers from GCatholic (current as of July 9, 2019)
|-
! class="unsortable"|
! Name
! Recognition
! Rite
! Seat
! Polity
! Jurisdictions
! Bishops
! Members
|-
|
|Coptic Catholic Church
|1741
| rowspan=3 | Alexandrian
|Cathedral of Our Lady, Cairo, Egypt
|Patriarchate || || ||
|-
|
|Eritrean Catholic Church
|2015
|Kidane Mehret cathedral, Asmara, Eritrea
|Metropolitanate || || ||
|-
| 
|Ethiopian Catholic Church
|1846
|Cathedral of the Nativity of the Blessed Virgin Mary, Addis Ababa, Ethiopia
|Metropolitanate || || ||
|-
|
|Armenian Catholic Church
|1742
|Armenian
|Cathedral of Saint Elias and Saint Gregory, Beirut, Lebanon
|Patriarchate || || ||
|-
|
|Albanian Greek Catholic Church
|1628
| rowspan=14 | Byzantine
|Pro-Cathedral of Saint Mary and Saint Louis, Vlorë, Albania
|Apostolic administration (southern Albania)|| || ||
|-
|
|Belarusian Greek Catholic Church
|1596
|none
|Apostolic Visitation|| || ||
|-
|
|Bulgarian Greek Catholic Church
|1861
|Cathedral of the Dormition, Sofia, Bulgaria
|Eparchy (Sofia)|| || ||
|-
| 
|Greek Catholic Church of Croatia and Serbia
|1611
|several
|no unified structure|| || ||
|-
|
|Greek Byzantine Catholic Church
|1911
|several
|no unified structure|| || ||
|-
|
|Hungarian Greek Catholic Church
|1912
|Cathedral of Hajdúdorog, Debrecen, Hungary
|Metropolitanate (Hajdúdorog)|| ||  ||
|-
|
|Italo-Albanian Catholic Church
|1784
|several
|no unified structure|| || ||
|-
|
|Macedonian Greek Catholic Church
|2001
|Cathedral of the Assumption, Strumica, North Macedonia
|Eparchy (Strumica-Skopje)|| ||||
|-
|
|Melkite Greek Catholic Church
|1726
|Cathedral of the Dormition, Damascus, Syria
|Patriarchate || || ||
|-
|
|Romanian Greek Catholic Church
|1697
|Cathedral of the Holy Trinity, Blaj, Romania
|Major archiepiscopate (Făgăraș and Alba Iulia)|| || ||
|-
|
|Russian Greek Catholic Church
|1905
|none
|none|| ||||<ref>{{Cite web |url=https://inosmi.ru/politic/20170613/239567109.html |title=Русские католики ищут признания папы |author=Фрэнсис Рокка |lang=ru |website=ИноСМИ |date=2017-06-13 |quote=Оригинал публикации: Russian Catholics Seek Pope's Nod. Статья была опубликована в газете The Wall Street Journal 2017-06-07. Перевод: портал «ИноСМИ» |access-date=2020-06-25}}</ref>
|-
|
|Ruthenian Greek Catholic Church
|1646
|Cathedral of Saint John the Baptist, Pittsburgh, United States
|Metropolitanate|| ||  ||
|-
| 
|Slovak Greek Catholic Church
|1646
|Cathedral of Saint John the Baptist, Prešov, Slovakia
|Metropolitanate (Prešov)|| ||  ||
|-
|
|Ukrainian Greek Catholic Church
|1595
|Cathedral of the Resurrection, Kyiv, Ukraine
|Major archiepiscopate (Kyiv–Galicia)|| || ||
|-
|
|Chaldean Catholic Church
|1552
| rowspan=2 | East Syriac
|Cathedral of Our Lady of Sorrows, Baghdad, Iraq
|Patriarchate || || ||
|-
|
|Syro-Malabar Catholic Church
|est. First C.,  present hierarchy 1923
|Cathedral of Our Lady, Ernakulam, Kerala, India
|Major archiepiscopate || || ||
|-
|
|Antiochene Syriac Maronite Church
| data-sort-value="0325" | est. Seventh C.  reentered communion 1154
| rowspan=3 | West Syriac
|Church of Bkerké, Bkerké, Lebanon
|Patriarchate || || ||
|-
|
|Syriac Catholic Church
|1781
|Syriac Catholic Cathedral of Saint Paul, Damascus, Syria
|Patriarchate || || ||
|-
|
|Syro-Malankara Catholic Church
|1930
|Cathedral of Saint Mary, Pattom, Kerala, India
|Major archiepiscopate || || ||
|-
|
|Other
| 
|various|several|Ordinariates || ||||
|- class="sortbottom"
! Total
!
!
!
!
!
!
!
!
|}

Membership

Eastern Catholic churches make up a small percentage of the membership in the Catholic Church when compared to the Latin Church, which has over 1.2 billion members. The 2017 statistics collected by the Catholic Near East Welfare Association (CNEWA) show that the four largest Eastern Catholic Churches are the Ukrainian Greek Catholic Church with 4.5 million members (roughly 25% of all Eastern Catholics), the Syro-Malabar Catholic Church with 4.3 million members (24%), the Maronite Church with 3.5 million members (20%), and the Melkite Greek Catholic Church with 1.6 million members (9%).

Other
The list shows that an individual autonomous, particular church may have distinct jurisdictions (local particular churches) in several countries.

The Ruthenian Greek Catholic Church is organized in an exceptional way because of a constituent metropolia: the Ruthenian Catholic Metropolitan Church of Pittsburgh in Pennsylvania, United States. The latter is also, unofficially, referred to as the Byzantine Catholic Church in America. Canon law treats it as if it held the rank of an autonomous metropolitan particular church because of the circumstances surrounding its 1969 establishment as an ecclesiastical province. At that time, conditions in the Rusyn homeland, known as Carpatho-Rus, were such that the Greek Catholic Church had been forcibly suppressed by the Soviet authorities. When Communist rule ended, the Greek Catholic Eparchy of Mukachevo (founded in 1771) re-emerged. As of the early 21st century, it has some 320,000 adherents, greater than the number in the Pittsburgh metropolia. In addition, an apostolic exarchate established in 1996 for Catholics of Byzantine rite in the Czech Republic is classed as another part of the Ruthenian Catholic Church.

On the  website, the Ruthenian Catholic Apostolic Exarchate of Czech Republic is mentioned in a list of Eastern churches, of which all the rest are autonomous particular churches. This is a mistake, since recognition within the Catholic Church of the autonomous status of a particular church can only be granted by the Holy See. It classifies this church as one of the constituent local particular churches of the autonomous Ruthenian Catholic Church.

Persecution
Eastern Europe

A study by Methodios Stadnik states: "The Georgian Byzantine Catholic Exarch, Fr. Shio , and two Georgian Catholic priests of the Latin Church were executed by the Soviet authorities in 1937 after having been held in captivity in Solovki prison and the northern gulags from 1923." Christopher Zugger writes, in The Forgotten: "By 1936, the Byzantine Catholic Church of Georgia had two communities, served by a bishop and four priests, with 8,000 believers", and he identifies the bishop as Shio Batmalashvili.  mentions, on the Ukrainian Helsinki Human Rights Union website, that "the Catholic administrator for Georgia Shio Batmalashvili" was one of those executed as "anti-Soviet elements" in 1937.

Zugger calls Batmalashvili a bishop; Stadnik is ambiguous, calling him an exarch but giving him the title of Father; Ovsiyenko merely refers to him as "the Catholic administrator" without specifying whether he was a bishop or a priest and whether he was in charge of a Latin or a Byzantine jurisdiction.

If Batmalashvili was an exarch, and not instead a bishop connected with the Latin diocese of Tiraspol, which had its seat at Saratov on the Volga River, to which Georgian Catholics even of Byzantine rite belonged  this would mean that a Georgian Byzantine-Rite Catholic Church existed, even if only as a local particular Church. However, since the establishment of a new hierarchical jurisdiction must be published in Acta Apostolicae Sedis, and no mention of the setting up of such a jurisdiction for Byzantine Georgian Catholics exists in that official gazette of the Holy See, the claim appears to be unfounded.

The 1930s editions of Annuario Pontificio do not mention Batmalashvili. If indeed he was a bishop, he may then have been one of those secretly ordained for the service of the Church in the Soviet Union by French Jesuit Bishop Michel d'Herbigny, who was president of the Pontifical Commission for Russia from 1925 to 1934. In the circumstances of that time, the Holy See would have been incapable of setting up a new Byzantine exarchate within the Soviet Union, since Greek Catholics in the Soviet Union were being forced to join the Russian Orthodox Church.

Batmalashvili's name is not among those given in as the four "underground" apostolic administrators (only one of whom appears to have been a bishop) for the four sections into which the diocese of Tiraspol was divided after the resignation in 1930 of its already exiled last bishop, Josef Alois Kessler. This source gives Father Stefan Demurow as apostolic administrator of "Tbilisi and Georgia" and says he was executed in 1938. Other sources associate Demurow with Azerbaijan and say that, rather than being executed, he died in a Siberian Gulag.

Until 1994, the United States annual publication Catholic Almanac listed "Georgian" among the Greek Catholic churches. Until corrected in 1995, it appears to have been making a mistake similar to that made on the equally unofficial  site about the Czech Greek Catholics.

There was a short-lived Greek Catholic movement among the ethnic Estonians in the Orthodox Church in Estonia during the interwar period of the 20th century, consisting of two to three parishes, not raised to the level of a local particular church with its own head. This group was liquidated by the Soviet regime and is now extinct.

Muslim world

Muslim persecution of Christians dates back to the founding of Islam, and continues to this day. Countries in which Christians have suffered acute discrimination, persecution and often death include: Somalia, Syria, Iraq, Afghanistan, Saudi Arabia, Maldives, Pakistan, Iran, Yemen, Palestinian Territories, Egypt, Turkey, Qatar, Uzbekistan, Jordan, Oman, Kuwait, Kazakhstan, Tajikistan, Turkmenistan, Kyrgyzstan, Eritrea, United Arab Emirates, and North Caucasus.

United States

While not subject to the kind of physical dangers or persecution from government authorities encountered in Eastern Europe or the Middle East, adherents of Eastern Catholic Churches in United States, most of whom were relatively new immigrants from Eastern Europe, encountered difficulties due to hostility from the Latin Church clergy who dominated the Catholic hierarchy in United States who found them alien. In particular, immigration of Eastern Rite priests who were married, common in their churches but extremely rare in Latin churches, was forbidden or severely limited and some Latin Church bishops actively interfered with the pastoral work of those who did arrive. Some bishops sought to forbid all non-Latin Catholic priests from coming to United States at all. Many Eastern Catholic immigrants to United States were thus either assimilated into the Latin Church or joined the Eastern Orthodox Church. One former Eastern Catholic priest, Alexis Toth, is well known for having abandoned Catholicism following criticism and sanctions from Latin authorities including John Ireland, the Bishop of Saint Paul, and joining the Orthodox Church. Toth has been canonized as an Eastern Orthodox saint for having led as many as 20,000 disaffected former Eastern Catholics to the Orthodox Church, particularly the American Carpatho-Russian Orthodox Diocese.

See also

Notes

 References 

Further reading
 
 Faris, John D., & Jobe Abbass, OFM Conv., eds. A Practical Commentary to the Code of Canons of the Eastern Churches'', 2 vols. Montréal: Librairie Wilson & Lafleur, 2019.

External links

 Eastern Catholic Church statistics 2015 
 Common Declaration of Pope Benedict XVI and the Ecumenical Patriarch Bartholomew I, 2006
 Example of Eastern Catholic Chant in English

 
Religious organizations based in Vatican City